The Red River Revel (called simply The Revel by locals) is an annual festival of food, culture, art and music that takes place in Shreveport, Louisiana, annually in the month of October. The Revel began in 1976 as a bicentennial celebration, sponsored by The Junior League of Shreveport. It is a nonprofit festival, and any money garnered from commerce that takes place goes back into the financial pool for the next year's Revel.

In several of the years of the festival, mosaics have been produced on the festival grounds which lasted after it was over. An artist creates a wadesign that includes the Revel logo, and attendees work to put colored tile pieces in place to match the design.  While some of the mosaics of past years have been removed or blocked from sight due to subsequent construction, others remain visible, including on the base of the Texas Street Bridge. The Revel hosts the booths of many artists each year which include paintings, jewelry and crafts, as well as a children's area to provide art education for kids. The festival also features live music. Artists such as Benjy Davis Project and Corey Smith (musician) have played on the Revel's stages.

No Revel was held in 2020, but it returned the next year.

Shreveport Festival Plaza

 Located in downtown Shreveport on the banks of the Red River, Shreveport's Festival Plaza serves as a  popular space for concerts, festivals, public events, and private events. Some of Festival Plaza's most notable events include Shreveport BREW (Shreveport's premiere beer festival), CORKED (Shreveport's premiere wine festival), Shreveport Farmer's Market, MudBug Madness, Holiday in Dixie, and Let The Good Times Roll.

References

External links 
 Official site

Music festivals in Louisiana
Culture of Shreveport, Louisiana
Tourist attractions in Shreveport, Louisiana
Music festivals established in 1976
Red River of the South